Sheriff of Tombstone  is a 1941 American Western film directed by Joseph Kane and starring Roy Rogers and George "Gabby" Hayes.

Plot 
Lawman Brett Starr leaves his job in Dodge City to take up a sheriff's job in Tombstone, Arizona where his two brothers live. Brett finds out that the position has been offered to the unscrupulous lawman Shotgun Cassidy.  Starr impersonates Shotgun and after he is appointed sheriff seeks to expose the corruption and wrongdoing of the town authorities.

Brett's brother Bill is alive but brother Arthur was killed riding guard for a stagecoach.  Mayor Luke Keeler appoints Brett Starr as Sheriff thinking he was Shotgun Cassidy.  The Mayor, A. J. Slade and Joe Martinez (also Wells Fargo banker John Anderson) plan to take Granny Carson's interest in her silver mine for back taxes.  The real Shotgun Cassidy arrives and the two opposing sides are set:  Carson family and townsfolk against new Sheriff Shotgun and corrupt city officials.

Wells Fargo John Anderson is the double agent for the bad guys.  Barmaid Queenie Whittaker is daughter to Judge Gabby and she works for the Carson side.  Instead of shipping silver, Starr loads the wagons with men carrying rifles.  When the convoy is attacked by robbers, most are shot dead.  Shotgun, Crowley and Joe Martinez escape and set up sharpshooters in town.   Cassity is shot and Anderson, Keeler and Slade arrested for trial. Brett gets Mary in the end.

Cast

Soundtrack 
 Roy Rogers - "Ridin' On a Rocky Road"
 Sally Payne, with Oscar Gahan (Piano) and Spade Cooley (Fiddle Player) - "Two-Gun Pete"
 Sally Payne - "Don't Gamble With Romance"
 Roy Rogers and George "Gabby" Hayes - "Sons of the Western Soil"

External links 
 
 

1941 films
1941 Western (genre) films
American Western (genre) films
American black-and-white films
Republic Pictures films
Films directed by Joseph Kane
1940s English-language films
1940s American films